Pals First is a lost 1926 American silent drama film produced and directed by Edwin Carewe. It stars Dolores del Río and Lloyd Hughes. Edwin Carewe directed the earlier 1918 version for Yorke Film Corporation. It was also called Pals First.

Cast
 Dolores del Río as Jeanne Lamont
 Lloyd Hughes as Richard Castleman / Danny Rowland
 Alec B. Francis as Dominie
 George Cooper as The Squirrel
 Edward Earle as Dr. Harry Shilton
 Hamilton Morse as Judge Lamont
 George H. Reed as Uncle Alex
 Alice Nichols as Aunt Caroline
 Alice Belcher as Charley Anderson
 Margaret Gray as Girl (uncredited)

Comments
Pals First was the first film starring Dolores del Rio. For its advertising the First National circulated a photo in major film magazines, which Dolores wore a comb, with photos of six male stars of the production company.

References

External links 
Pals First at IMDb.com

1926 films
1926 drama films
Silent American drama films
American silent feature films
Lost American films
American black-and-white films
1920s English-language films
First National Pictures films
Films directed by Edwin Carewe
1926 lost films
Lost drama films
1920s American films